A facial mask is a creamy or thick pasted mask applied to clean or smoothen the face. Facial masks often contain minerals, vitamins, and fruit extracts, such as cactus and cucumber. A sheet mask is a piece of paper, cellulose or fabric used to apply a facial mask.

The first facial mask was invented in Ohio, United States, during the 19th century by Madame Rowley. It was called the "Toilet Mask" or the first "face glove", and was advertised as able to 'bleach, purify and preserve the complexion' of the skin. It was patented in 1875. There are different kinds of masks for different purposes; some are deep cleansing for cleaning the pores. The perceived effect of a facial mask treatment can be revitalizing, rejuvenating or refreshing. Facial masks can be used on both men and women. Although widely believed to provide tighter pores, increased skin clarity, and a reduction in facial skin wrinkles, masks have not been shown to be any more effective at accomplishing these things than a standard moisturizing lotion.

Some masks are washed off with tepid water, others are peeled off by hand. Duration for wearing a mask depends on type of mask, but can be three minutes to 30 minutes, and sometimes the whole night.

Honey is a very popular mask because it smooths skin, and cleans pores. A popular home remedy includes a slice of cucumber on the eyes. Some also use pickle juice.

Facial masks should be selected according to skin type. Clay and mud masks suit oily skin; cream-based masks work best on dry skin types. Masks should be used only on cleansed skin for the best results. Firming masks should not be applied on the eye area because they can cause itching.

See also 

Cleanser
Facial
Moisturizer
Anti-aging cream

References

Hygiene
Skin care